László Detre may refer to:

 László Detre (microbiologist) (1874–1939), Hungarian physician and microbiologist
 László Detre (astronomer) (1906–1974), Hungarian astronomer